is a Japanese diver. He competed at the 1984 Summer Olympics, the 1988 Summer Olympics and the 1992 Summer Olympics.

References

1966 births
Living people
Japanese male divers
Olympic divers of Japan
Divers at the 1984 Summer Olympics
Divers at the 1988 Summer Olympics
Divers at the 1992 Summer Olympics
Place of birth missing (living people)
20th-century Japanese people